The European Code of Conduct for Clearing and Settlement (Code of Conduct) is an initiative of European securities exchanges, clearing houses and central securities depositories to set uniform rules for trading, clearing, settlement and custody services for stocks. The Code of Conduct contains rules which should enhance transparency for customers and improve services for cross-border transactions as well as harmonise the European capital market and revitalise the international securities traffic.

The Code of Conduct was agreed on 31 October 2006 by all members of the Federation of European Securities Exchanges (FESE), the European Association of Central Counterparty Clearing Houses (EACH) and the European Central Securities Depositories Association (ECSDA).

The Code of Conduct is not only meant to guarantee an increased transparency of prices and services in the cross-border securities business, but is also supposed to stimulate the international securities traffic. Due to technical interfaces built to ensure the interoperability of diverse platforms, segregated accounting as well as newly structured services the market participants will be enabled to order Clearing, Settlement and Safekeeping at different institutions.

The Code contains rules, which should lead to the improvement of price transparency, to facilitate and open access to cross-border services (trade, clearing and settlement) and finally to separate services relating to trade, clearing settlement, and custody services and to enable the separate billing of these services.

External links
The European Code of Conduct for Clearing and Settlement - complete text.

Financial regulation